The Nordic Championships often refers to a number of sporting competitions for Nordic countries. For some of the competitions they are the top achievement in a sport or contest for Nordic athletes. Nordic Championships were held in a number of sports, but have usually been discontinued in favour of more global tournaments.

Nordic Artistic Gymnastics Championships
Nordic Badminton Championships, defunct
Nordic Bouldering and Lead Climbing Championships
Nordic Chess Championship
Nordic Figure Skating Championships
Nordic Football Championship, discontinued 1983 with a short revival in 2001
Nordic Quizzing Championships
Nordic Strongman Championships
Nordic Swimming Championships
Scandinavian Touring Car Championship

Athletics
Athletics
Indoor
Marathon
Cross Country
Combined Events
Race Walking
Indoor Race Walking
Under-23
Under-20
Junior Combined Events

Shooting
Handgun
Mini Rifle
Shotgun
Rifle

For the ongoing annual international youth football tournament featuring the Nordic nations and other invited national teams, see:

Nordic Under-17 Football Championship